Mitrager is a genus of Asian dwarf spiders that was first described by P. J. van Helsdingen in 1985.

Species 
 it contains twenty-five species:

 Mitrager angelus (Tanasevitch, 1998) – Nepal
 Mitrager assueta (Tanasevitch, 1998) – Nepal
 Mitrager clypeellum (Tanasevitch, 1998) – Nepal
 Mitrager cornuta (Tanasevitch, 2015) – India
 Mitrager coronata (Tanasevitch, 1998) – Nepal
 Mitrager dismodicoides (Wunderlich, 1974) – Nepal
 Mitrager elongatus (Wunderlich, 1974) – Nepal
 Mitrager falcifera (Tanasevitch, 1998) – Nepal
 Mitrager falciferoides (Tanasevitch, 2015) – India
 Mitrager globiceps (Thaler, 1987) – India (Kashmir)
 Mitrager hirsuta (Wunderlich, 1974) – Nepal
 Mitrager lineata (Wunderlich, 1974) – Nepal
 Mitrager lopchu (Tanasevitch, 2015) – India
 Mitrager lucida (Wunderlich, 1974) – Nepal
 Mitrager malearmata (Tanasevitch, 1998) – Nepal
 Mitrager modesta (Tanasevitch, 1998) – Nepal
 Mitrager noordami van Helsdingen, 1985 (type) – Indonesia (Java)
 Mitrager rustica (Tanasevitch, 2015) – India
 Mitrager savigniformis (Tanasevitch, 1998) – Nepal
 Mitrager sexoculata (Wunderlich, 1974) – Nepal
 Mitrager sexoculorum (Tanasevitch, 1998) – Nepal
 Mitrager tholusa (Tanasevitch, 1998) – Nepal
 Mitrager triceps (Tanasevitch, 2020) – Nepal
 Mitrager unicolor (Wunderlich, 1974) – Nepal
 Mitrager villosus (Tanasevitch, 2015) – India

See also
 List of Linyphiidae species (I–P)

References

Linyphiidae
Spiders of Asia